Hey, Let's Twist! is a 1961 American musical film directed by Greg Garrison and written by Hal Hackady. The film stars Joey Dee, Jo Ann Campbell, Teddy Randazzo, Kay Armen, Zohra Lampert and Dino Di Luca. The film was released on December 31, 1961, by Paramount Pictures.

The same team later made Two Tickets to Paris (1962).

Plot
The rise, fall, and resurgence of the Peppermint Lounge club is chronicled. The children of the owner almost ruin the club by updating the place but realize their error.

Cast
 Joey Dee as himself
 Jo Ann Campbell as Piper
 Teddy Randazzo as Rickey Dee
 Kay Armen as Angie
 Zohra Lampert as Sharon
 Dino Di Luca as Papa
 Hope Hampton as herself
 Richard Dickens as Rore 
 The Peppermint Loungers as Themselves
 Joe Pesci as Extra (uncredited) (His movie debut)

Production
The film shot for two weeks at Pathe Studios in New York. Filming started November 1961. It was made independently and distributed through Paramount. There were a number of "twist" movies shot around the same time, others including Don't Knock the Twist.

Reception
The film performed well at the box office. A sequel to be set in Paris was announced, Viva La Twist. This eventually became Two Tickets to Paris.

References

External links 
 
 Soundtrack by Joey Dee And The Starliters (Label:Roulette – R 25168 ) 
 https://www.discogs.com/Joey-Dee-The-Starliters-Hey-Lets-Twist-Original-Soundtrack-Recording/release/2975349

1961 films
1961 directorial debut films
1961 musical films
American black-and-white films
American musical films
1960s English-language films
Paramount Pictures films
1960s American films